Alexander of Ashby was a celebrated English theologian and poet, who flourished about the year 1220. Scarcely anything is known of his history, except that he appears to have been prior of Canons Ashby, in Northamptonshire. Some writers make him a native of Somersetshire; others of Staffordshire; and some have confounded him with Alexander Neckam.

He wrote various theological and historical works in prose, particularly a chronicle of England, which are still found scattered in manuscripts. His poetry, in which he sought to imitate Ovid and Ausonius, is much praised by John Bale. Amongst other poems, we may enumerate one in elegiacs, giving a description of all the saints' days throughout the year, with lives of the saints who were celebrated on each and a metrical compendium of Bible History.

A further account of Alexander's works will be found in Thomas Tanner's Bibliotheca, and in Polycarp Leyser's Hist. Poet. Med. Ævi.

Sources

English theologians
12th-century births
13th-century deaths
English priors
History of Northamptonshire
English male poets